Saint-Paul-de-Vern (Languedocien: Sent Pau de Vèrn) is a commune in the Lot department in south-western France.

See also
 Communes of the Lot department

References

Saintpauldevern